Armillaria affinis is a species of agaric fungus in the family Physalacriaceae. This species is found in Central America.

See also 
List of Armillaria species

References 

affinis
Fungi described in 1989
Fungi of Central America
Fungal tree pathogens and diseases